Jesse Clegg (born June 14, 1988) is a South African singer-songwriter, guitarist and pianist, whose three studio albums, When I Wake Up, his 2011 follow up Life on Mars, and his latest, Things Unseen, have made Clegg a platinum-selling success in his home country. He is the son of Johnny Clegg, who was a prominent musician and anti-apartheid activist.

Biography
The son of Johnny Clegg, Jesse spent the first six years of his life on tour with his father.

After the widespread acclaim of his first album, Clegg's music caught the attention of the Canadian record producer David Bottrill. He subsequently moved to Toronto for four months to work with Bottrill who produced his second album. Life on Mars was recorded at Metalworks Studios in Mississauga, Ontario. Another notable contributor was the recording engineer Bob Ludwig who mastered the album in New York.

In 2014, Clegg brought his music to the international stage. He embarked on a seven-week tour across the United States and Canada, which comprised 32 shows in 31 cities. He has also played numerous high-profile showcase festivals in the US – including the CMJ Music Marathon New Music Seminar, and the CBGB Festival. On 14 June 2014, Clegg performed on the main stage at UK's Isle of Wight Festival.

In 2015, Clegg returned to studio to record new material for his third studio release, entitled Things Unseen. Produced by Dennholm Harding, the first single, "Use Me", was released in July, and immediately started charting on national radio, reaching the No. 1 spot on several stations. It remained in the iTunes Top 40 for three months.

The second single, "Souvenir", was released in December, and the album was launched in June 2016 at a sold-out event in Johannesburg. The album debuted in the iTunes Top 10 albums chart. The latest single, "Breathing", featured a collaboration with Shekhinah. It was met with widespread acclaim and high rotation play-listing on national stations. It was the second No. 1 single off of the album. Clegg has recently returned from his second North American tour, where he played 36 shows across the continent from 17 March to 1 May 2016.

He has released six Top 10 singles and toured extensively throughout South Africa. As an official ambassador for the Nelson Mandela 46664 Foundation, Clegg has been invited to play at Radio City Music Hall in New York for the annual Mandela Day Concert. He has been nominated for three South African Music Awards.

Discography

Albums
 When I Wake Up (2008)
 Life on Mars (2011)
 Jesse Clegg Live & Unplugged (2012)
 Things Unseen (2016)

References

External links
 

1988 births
Living people
People from Johannesburg
South African musicians
South African people of English-Jewish descent
South African people of Lithuanian-Jewish descent
South African people of Polish-Jewish descent
South African people of Scottish descent
South African people of Zimbabwean descent